The Penn Club is a private social club in Philadelphia. It was organized on March 18, 1875, with a mission to heighten awareness of arts and culture at the time of the Centennial Exposition.

History
With an original home on 8th and Locusts streets in Philadelphia, the Club came to existence after the American Civil War and prior to the Centennial Exhibition. The organizers were among those whose characters had been formed during the period of the war and that of the reconstruction that followed. Morton McMichael, Jr. made the lease of 720 Locust Street with Horace Howard Furness. James P. Sims arranged the scheme of decoration and designed the mantel upon which McMichael and Wharton Barker placed the statue of William Penn, modeled in plaster by Muller. Henry Armitt Brown hung the picture said to represent William Penn. The membership was limited to 200.

The first president of the Club was Wharton Barker (1846–1921), who was a prominent abolitionist and president of the Philadelphia Stock Exchange. He was also one of the original fifty members who founded the Union Club, which later became the Union League of Philadelphia.

Purpose
The intention of the Club is expressed in its charter:

The Penn Club continues to this day, and meets in Center City, Philadelphia. The club is named for William Penn, and has no historical or current association with the University of Pennsylvania. The club's motto is: "Dum Clavum Teneam", which is taken from the Penn family's coat of arms.

See also
 List of traditional gentlemen's clubs in the United States

References
Cohen, Charles J., (1924). History of The Penn Club. John C. Winston Company, Philadelphia.
Hubbard, Cortlandt van Dyke, (1976).  History of The Penn Club. The Winchell Company, Philadelphia (LOC #77-71621).

William Penn: an address delivered before the Penn Club of Philadelphia, October 27, 1877, the one hundred and ninety-fifth anniversary of the landing at Upland (1877).
President Papadakis Honored by Penn Club.

Organizations based in Philadelphia
Organizations established in 1875
Gentlemen's clubs in the United States
Arts organizations established in the 1870s
Clubs and societies in Pennsylvania
1875 establishments in Pennsylvania